Asiya Naqash  Asiea Naqash is an Indian politician and the former member of the Jammu and Kashmir Legislative Assembly, who represented Hazratbal  constituency from 2014 to June 2018 until the coalition government was ended by the Bhartiya Janata Party and Jammu and Kashmir Peoples Democratic Party in the state.

Career
Asiya's career began in 2002 when she established political associations with Jammu and Kashmir Peoples Democratic Party, and later in 2014 Jammu and Kashmir Legislative Assembly election, she was elected from Hazratbal Srinagar. She has served as the minister of state for Health & Medical Education, Housing & Urban Development, Industries and commerce,  Power Development, and Social Welfare.

References 

Living people
University of Kashmir alumni
People from Srinagar district
Jammu and Kashmir Peoples Democratic Party politicians
21st-century Indian women politicians
21st-century Indian politicians
Kashmiri people
Year of birth missing (living people)
Place of birth missing (living people)